Tillamook may refer to:

Places:
 Tillamook County, Oregon, United States
 Tillamook, Oregon, a city, the seat of Tillamook County
 Tillamook River, United States
 Tillamook Bay, a bay in the northwestern part of Oregon
 Tillamook Head, a natural feature of the Oregon Coast
 Tillamook State Forest, a forest in Oregon
 Tillamook Rock Light, a lighthouse on the Oregon Coast
 Tillamook Air Museum, an aviation museum in Oregon

Other:
 Tillamook people, a Native American tribe of western Oregon, United States
 Tillamook, a fictional version of the aforementioned Native American tribe.
 Tillamook language, an extinct language
 Tillamook Burn, a series of forest fires in Oregon
 Tillamook Cheddar (dog), an American Jack Russell terrier known for her paintings
 Tillamook County Creamery Association, makers of dairy products sold under the "Tillamook" brand name
 P55C, Tillamook, a family of Pentium MMX mobile computer processors from Intel
 USS Tillamook, the name of more than one United States Navy ship